Sante Orsola e Caterina was a small Roman Catholic confraternity church located near a convent found in Tor de' Specchi, on the western slopes of the Campidoglio, in the rione Campitelli of Rome, Italy. The church was torn down to make space for a highway.

The church was built at the site of a parish church once called San Niccolò de Funari. The church was transferred to a confraternity, made archconfraternity under Clement X, and rededicated to St Ursula and St Catherine, and rebuilt under the designs of Carlo de Dominicis.

References

Churches of Rome (rione Campitelli)
Destroyed Roman Catholic churches in Rome